Spin is a 1995 documentary film by Brian Springer composed of raw satellite feeds featuring politicians' pre-appearance planning. It covers the presidential election as well as the 1992 Los Angeles riots and the Operation Rescue abortion protests.

Using the 1992 presidential election as his springboard, Springer captures the behind-the-scenes schemes of politicians and newscasters in the early 1990s. Pat Robertson banters about "homos," Al Gore learns how to avoid abortion questions,and George H. W. Bush talks to Larry King about Halcion—all presuming they are off camera. Composed of 100% unauthorized satellite footage, Spin is an exposé of media-constructed reality.

The film also documents behind-the-scenes footage of Larry Agran who unsuccessfully sought the Democratic Party nomination for president. Agran was generally ignored by the media during his candidacy, a topic covered in the documentary. The media did not report his polling numbers even as he met or exceeded the support of other candidates such as Jerry Brown. Party officials excluded him from most debates on various grounds, even having him arrested when he interrupted to ask to participate. When he managed to join the other candidates in any forum, his ideas went unreported. He was cropped out in photographs with other candidates.

Stephen Holden of The New York Times described the film as "a devastating critique of television's profound manipulativeness in the way it packages the news and politics". Spin is a follow-up of the 1992 film Feed, for which Springer provided much of the raw satellite footage.

See also 
 Media manipulation
 Propaganda
 Spin (propaganda)

References

External links 
 
 Spin at the Internet Archive
 Spin (Video Data Bank)

1995 films
Documentary films about journalism
Documentary films about American politics
Documentary films about abortion
Films about propaganda
1990s English-language films
1990s American films